Kʼan Ahk I, also known as Ruler A was a king of that Mayan city. He is also known as Turtleshell.

He reigned c. 460. It seems that he was captured.

His name combines the distinctive knotted headdress of God N with that aged earth deity's turtle shell and kʼan ("yellow/precious") marking; altogether it is probably read as itzamkʼanahk.

Notes

Kings of Piedras Negras
5th century in the Maya civilization
5th-century monarchs in North America